The Oslo National Academy of the Arts (KHiO) is a university college in Oslo, Norway, that provides education in visual arts, design and performing arts. It is one of two public institutes of higher learning in Norway that teaches in visual arts and design, the other is the Bergen National Academy of the Arts in Bergen.

The Academy is divided into academic departments, with responsibility for the various subject areas, and administrative sections, which handle shared administrative tasks.

Oslo National Academy of the Arts was ranked among the world's 60 best design programs by Bloomberg Businessweek.

History 
The Academy was established in 1996 through the amalgamation of five independent colleges:

 The National Academy of Craft and Art Industry (Statens håndverks- og kunstindustriskole), founded in 1818
 The National Academy of Fine Arts (Statens kunstakademi), founded in 1909
 The National Academy of Theatre (Statens teaterhøgskole), founded in 1952
 The National Academy of Opera (Statens operahøgskole), founded in 1964
 The National Academy of Ballet (Statens balletthøgskole), founded in 1979

These former colleges are now organised in three faculties: the Faculty of Design, the Faculty of Performing Arts and the Faculty of Visual Arts.

Academic departments 

The Design department has academic responsibility for educational programmes in graphic design, illustration, fashion design, costume design, interior design and furniture design. The Design department offers both Master's and Bachelor's programmes in graphic design, illustration, fashion design, costume design, interior design and furniture design.
The Design department started life as Statens håndverks- og industriskole (Oslo National College of Art and Design) (SHKS), founded in 1818. The department is constantly seeking to develop the legacy and craft traditions of the SHKS, and regards its various workshop facilities as central to this effort.

The Art and Craft department has academic responsibility for educational programmes in textile art, printmaking and drawing, ceramic art, and metal and jewellery art.

The Academy of Fine Art has academic responsibility for educational programmes in fine art. It works across media, disciplines and approaches, exploring questions of form and material as well as post-conceptual, social and political issues.

The Academy of Theatre has academic responsibility for educational programmes for actors and theatre directors, offering specialisations in acting, direction, stage writing and scenography, and a postgraduate certificate in education for drama teachers. Since its founding in 1953, the Academy of Theatre has been Norway's leading educational institution for the acting professions. The Academy offers a three-year Bachelor's course for actors and directors and a two-year Master's course in theatre, specialising in acting, direction, stage writing and stage design. The department also offers a practice-oriented teacher training course (PPU) for drama teachers.

The Academy of Dance has academic responsibility for educational programmes for choreographers and dancers in the fields of contemporary dance, classical ballet and jazz dance, and a postgraduate certificate in education for dance teachers.
The Academy of Dance was founded in 1979 as the National College of Ballet and Dance (Statens ballettskole). Since 1996 it has been part of Oslo National Academy of the Arts (Kunsthøgskolen i Oslo), which brings students of different disciplines together to form a broad, international community of arts and artistic skills. The unique facilities at the National Academy of the Arts, including well-equipped stages and studios, mean that students at the Academy of Dance have excellent opportunities to develop in a state-of-the-art working environment.

The Academy of Opera has academic responsibility for educational programmes in the field of opera, developing vocal and acting skills, with an emphasis on stage productions.
Featuring world-class educators and stage facilities, the Academy combines individual, group and project-based training. Stage productions and concerts represent important milestones under way in the programme. At the Academy, students are allowed to work with professional directors and conductors and a full team of stagehands. This provides students with a versatile, practical education and a solid foundation for becoming professional opera singers both in Norway and abroad.
A new Bachelor's programme in opera is currently being developed and is slated to begin autumn 2019.

Location 
The Oslo National Academy of the Arts has so far been housed in several buildings in Oslo. In the summer of 2003, the Faculty of Performing Arts was moved to the new campus at the old textile plant Seilduken at Grünerløkka in central Oslo. KHiO is situated next to the river Akerselva where the Academy rents a total space of 43 000 m2. In the summer of 2010, the remaining faculties joined.

The Academies current location at the former Seilduken plant is marked by a blue ceramic Oslo Byes Well plaque, located at the entrance to the buildings car park. The plaque reads 'Society for Oslo Byes Well. Christiania Seildugsfabrik. Founded in 1856, Discounted from 1960. Architect P.H Holtermann'.

Faculty 
The Faculty of Visual Arts included two professorships from the start. Jan Valentin Sæther occupied the professorship for painting from 1996 until 2002, whereas Istvan Lisztes was the first professor of sculpture.

Current professors include Michael O'Donnell, A. K. Dolven, Synne Bull, Dag Erik Elgin, Henrik Plenge Jakobsen, Aeron Bergman, Susanne Winterling, Jeannette Christensen and Stian Grøgaard.

External links 
 Kunsthøgskolen i Oslo, official website
 Kunstakademiet i Oslo, official website for Faculty of Visual Arts

References 

 
Universities and colleges in Norway
Art schools in Norway
Drama schools in Norway
Education in Oslo
Educational institutions established in 1996
Grünerløkka
1996 establishments in Norway